Wendy Bouchard (born 22 June 1980) is a French journalist, radio and television presenter.

Early life and education 
Born in Paris, Wendy Bouchard studied at the high school of Saint-Michel-de-Picpus in Paris. She graduated in history at the Sorbonne, then at the Institut d'études politiques de Paris and at the Centre de Formation des Journalistes (CFJ) in 2005.

Radio career 
In 2006, she joined the radio station Europe 1. In 2009, she presented for one season with Michel Drucker a cultural talk show titled Studio Europe 1 from Monday to Friday. Since August 2010, she presented on the same station the Le 22-23, a news and cultural program from Monday to Thursday, and Le bistrot du Dimanche on Sunday. In August 2011, she presented on the same station the program Après la plage. She then presented the same year for one season various programs such as Europe 1 Midi on weekends, Le débat des grandes voix on Saturday, and Le forum citoyen on Sunday. During summer 2012, she presented Europe 1 Soir in August and Les secrets de com''' on Saturday.

 Television career 
In May 2011, she co-hosted Rendez vous à Cannes on France 2 with Michel Drucker. The guests were Maïwenn, Jean Dujardin, Cécile de France, Jude Law, Dustin Hoffman, Carole Bouquet and André Dussollier. In January 2012, she co-hosted at the second part of the evening L'art à tout prix with Olivier Picasso, for the Marcel Duchamp Prize. Since September 2012, she presents the program Zone Interdite'' on M6, succeeding to Mélissa Theuriau.

References

External links 

Profile of Wendy Bouchard on the official site of M6 

1980 births
Living people
French television journalists
Women television journalists
French women journalists
French radio presenters
French women radio presenters
French television presenters
French women television presenters
Journalists from Paris
Sciences Po alumni